The 1918 Rutgers Queensmen football team was an American football team that represented Rutgers University as an independent during the 1918 college football season. In their sixth season under head coach George Sanford, the team compiled a 5–2 record, shut out its first four opponents, and outscored all opponents by a total of 192 to 78.

Paul Robeson played at the end position for the 1917 and 1918 Rutgers teams, was selected by Frank G. Menke as a first-team All-American in both 1917 and 1918, and was inducted into the College Football Hall of Fame in 1995. Coach Sanford was inducted into the College Football Hall of Fame in 1971.

Schedule

References

Rutgers
Rutgers Scarlet Knights football seasons
Rutgers Queensmen football